Flore is a feminine given name. Notable persons with that name include:

 Flore Enyegue (born 1991), Cameroonian footballer
 Flore Gravesteijn (born 1987), Dutch volleyball player
 Flore Hazoumé (born 1959), Congolese writer
 Flore Levine-Cousyns (1898-1989), Belgian pianist
 Flore Maltine Ramarozatovo, Malagasy politician
 Flore Revalles (1889-1966), Swiss singer, dancer and actress
 Flore Vandenhoucke (born 1995), Belgian badminton player
 Flore Vasseur (born 1973), French filmmaker, novelist, journalist and entrepreneur
 Flore Zoé (born 1975), Dutch photographer

See also
Flor (given name)
Flora (given name)

Feminine given names